Poste may refer to:

 Poste Airport, (ICAO: FEFB, IATA: MKI), airport in Central African Republic
 Poste Point, a pointe in an Antarctica
 Paray-Vieille-Poste, a commune in France

Postal services
 La Poste (disambiguation), several postal services named "La Poste" (aka "Poste")
 Poste italiane, the Italian postal service
 Poste Maroc, Moroccan postal service
 Poste sammarinesi, the San Marino post bureau
 Pošte Srpske, Bosnian-Serb postal service
 Poste Vaticane, the Vatican post office
 Gabon Poste, Gabonese postal service
 Niger Poste, Nigerien postal service

People
 Beale Poste (1793–1871), Anglican cleric
 Gary Francis Poste (1937–2018), Zodiac Killer suspect
 Leslie I. Poste (1918–1996), librarian
 George Poste, English-American doctor

See also 

 La Poste (disambiguation)
 Post (disambiguation)